Edward John Chalmers Morton (1856 – 3 October 1902), known as E. J. C. Morton, was a British barrister and Liberal Party politician who sat in the House of Commons as a Member of Parliament (MP) for Devonport from 1892 until his death.

Morton was the son of John Chalmers Morton, and was educated at Harrow School and at St John's College, Cambridge, where he won a scholarship in 1879 and graduated with a Bachelor of Arts (B.A.) degree in 1880. He was called to the bar in 1885 at the Inner Temple, and practised on the North Eastern Circuit.

He was elected for Devonport at the 1892 general election, re-elected in 1895 and in 1900.

His obituary in The Times lists him as an active member of the liberal party, and a great platform speaker. He was listed in 1892 and in 1901 as secretary of the Home Rule Union.

Morton underwent an operation in early autumn 1902, and left for his sister's residence at Amberley, Gloucestershire to recover. He died there on 3 October 1902.

References

External links 
 

1856 births
1902 deaths
Alumni of St John's College, Cambridge
People educated at Harrow School
Liberal Party (UK) MPs for English constituencies
Members of the Inner Temple
Politics of Plymouth, Devon
UK MPs 1892–1895
UK MPs 1895–1900
UK MPs 1900–1906